Brownsboro Independent School District is a state recognized 4A public school district based in Brownsboro, Texas (USA).

In addition to Brownsboro, the district serves the cities of Chandler and portions of Coffee City, Athens, and Moore Station in northeastern Henderson County.

In 2021, the school district was rated "exceptional " by the Texas Education Agency.

Schools

High school (Grades 9-12) 
Brownsboro High School (Texas)

Junior high school (Grades 7-8) 
Brownsboro Junior High School

Intermediate schools (Grades 4-6) 
Brownsboro Intermediate
Chandler Intermediate

Elementary schools (Grades PK-3) 
Brownsboro Elementary
Chandler Elementary
2004 National Blue Ribbon School

References

External links 
Brownsboro ISD

School districts in Henderson County, Texas